Variations for Orchestra is an orchestral composition by the American composer Elliott Carter.  The work was commissioned by the Louisville Orchestra and was composed between 1953 and 1955.  It was given its premiere on 21 April 1956 by the Louisville Orchestra under the conductor Robert Whitney, both to whom the work is dedicated. This is Carter's next major work after his first String Quartet

Composition
Variations for Orchestra has a duration of roughly 24 minutes and consists of twelve connected movements comprising an introduction, a theme, nine variations, and a finale:
Introduction: Allegro
Theme: Andante
Variation 1: Vivace leggero
Variation 2: Pesante
Variation 3: Moderato
Variation 4: Ritardando molto
Variation 5: Allegro misterioso
Variation 6: Accelerando molto
Variation 7: Andante
Variation 8: Allegro giocoso
Variation 9: Andante
Finale: Allegro molto

Instrumentation
The work is scored for an orchestra comprising two flutes (2nd doubling piccolo), two oboes, two clarinets, two bassoons, four horns, two trumpets, two trombones, bass trombone, tuba, timpani, percussion, harp, and strings.

Reception
Variations for Orchestra has been praised by music critics.  Anthony Tommasini of The New York Times wrote, "[Carter's] goal was to write a work of exhilarating variety. Indeed, one way to listen to this piece is to forget everything about the theme-and-variations form and revel instead in the boldly contrasting moods, harmonies, colors and characters of the music."  Tim Page of The Washington Post similarly remarked:

References

Compositions by Elliott Carter
1955 compositions
Compositions for symphony orchestra
Variations
Music commissioned by the Louisville Orchestra
United States National Recording Registry recordings